Ivan Livingstone (born September 6, 1930) was a Canadian football player who played for the Calgary Stampeders, Montreal Alouettes, and BC Lions.

References

Living people
1930 births
Players of Canadian football from Quebec
Canadian football running backs
Calgary Stampeders players
BC Lions players
Montreal Alouettes players
Canadian football people from Montreal
Anglophone Quebec people